Girolamo da Cremona, also known as Girolamo de'Corradi, (fl. 1451–1483) was an Italian Renaissance painter, illuminator, and miniaturist of manuscripts and early printed books. He was influenced and furthered by Andrea Mantegna.

He was active in northern Italy, in Ferrara and Mantua in the 1450s to 1460s, later in Siena and Florence, and finally in Venice.

External links
http://www.wga.hu/frames-e.html?/html/g/girolamo/cremona/index.html
https://web.archive.org/web/20070926220701/http://www.getty.edu/art/gettyguide/artMakerDetails?maker=3359&page=1

1430s births
1480s deaths
15th-century Italian painters
Italian male painters
Painters from Cremona
Manuscript illuminators